In enzymology, a 2,3-diaminopropionate N-oxalyltransferase is an enzyme that catalyzes the chemical reaction

oxalyl-CoA + L-2,3-diaminopropanoate  CoA + N3-oxalyl-L-2,3-diaminopropanoate

Thus, the two substrates of this enzyme are oxalyl-CoA and L-2,3-diaminopropanoate, whereas its two products are CoA and N3-oxalyl-L-2,3-diaminopropanoate.

This enzyme belongs to the family of transferases, specifically those acyltransferases transferring groups other than aminoacyl groups.  The systematic name of this enzyme class is oxalyl-CoA:L-2,3-diaminopropanoate N3-oxalyltransferase. Other names in common use include oxalyldiaminopropionate synthase, ODAP synthase, oxalyl-CoA:L-alpha,beta-diaminopropionic acid oxalyltransferase, oxalyldiaminopropionic synthase, and oxalyl-CoA:L-2,3-diaminopropanoate 3-N-oxalyltransferase.

References

 

EC 2.3.1
Enzymes of unknown structure